Blake Mazza (born December 8, 1998) is an American football placekicker. He previously played for the SMU, Washington State Cougars, and the Arkansas Razorbacks.

High school career
Mazza attended Plano Senior High School in Plano, Texas. Coming out of high school, he was rated as a five-star recruit and the 12th best placekicker for the class of 2017 by Chris Sailer Kicking.

Statistics

College career

Arkansas

2017
Mazza received a scholarship offer from Army, but committed to the University of Arkansas, appearing as a walk-on for the 2017 team; he did not receive any playing time during the season.

SMU

2021
On January 20, 2021, Mazza announced he would be transferring from Washington State in order to play closer to home. Six days later, it was announced that Mazza would be transferring to Southern Methodist University (SMU).

Statistics

References

1998 births
Living people
People from Plano, Texas
American football placekickers
Players of American football from Texas
Arkansas Razorbacks football players
Washington State Cougars football players
SMU Mustangs football players